Strong Heart is the tenth studio album by American country music artist Patty Loveless. It was released on August 29, 2000 via Epic Records. It first charted on the Billboard Top Country Albums chart on September 16 (peaking at #13), and remaining on the charts for 34 weeks until May 19, 2001. The album also charted briefly on the main Top Billboard 200 chart. Two of the album's singles landed in the Country top 20: "That's The Kind Of Mood I'm In"#13, and "The Last Thing On My Mind" #20.

Critical reception

Track listing

Chart performance

References 

2000 albums
Epic Records albums
Patty Loveless albums
Albums produced by Emory Gordy Jr.